Wyoming is a city in Chisago County, Minnesota. The population was 7,791 at the time of the 2010 census.

History
Wyoming was platted in 1869 when the St. Paul and Duluth Railroad was extended to that point. The city took its name from Wyoming Township.

Wyoming served as the drop-off point for a Depression era kidnapping. In June 1933, William Hamm of Hamm's Brewery was released by his captors, the Barker–Karpis gang, following a collection of a $100,000 ransom payment ($1.825 mil. in 2015 dollars).

Geography
Wyoming is located along the South Branch of the Sunrise River.

Interstate 35 serves as a main route for the community.

Demographics

2010 census
As of the census of 2010, there were 7,791 people, 2,738 households, and 2,154 families living in the city. The racial makeup of the city was 96.6% White, 0.4% African American, 0.4% Native American, 0.9% Asian, 0.4% from other races, and 1.4% from two or more races. Hispanic or Latino of any race were 1.7% of the population.

There were 2,738 households, of which 41.7% had children under the age of 18 living with them, 65.9% were married couples living together, 8.2% had a female householder with no husband present, 4.6% had a male householder with no wife present, and 21.3% were non-families. 16.6% of all households were made up of individuals, and 8% had someone living alone who was 65 years of age or older. The average household size was 2.84 and the average family size was 3.19.

The median age in the city was 38.4 years. 28.4% of residents were under the age of 18; 7.1% were between the ages of 18 and 24; 25.8% were from 25 to 44; 29.8% were from 45 to 64; and 8.9% were 65 years of age or older. The gender makeup of the city was 50.3% male and 49.7% female.

2000 census
As of the census of 2000, there were 3,048 people, 1,023 households, and 848 families living in the city. The racial makeup of the city was 97.64% White, 0.39% African American, 0.52% Native American, 0.43% Asian, 0.07% Pacific Islander, 0.26% from other races, and 0.69% from two or more races. Hispanic or Latino of any race were 0.72% of the population.

There were 1,023 households, out of which 50.1% had children under the age of 18 living with them, 69.2% were married couples living together, 10.9% had a female householder with no husband present, and 17.1% were non-families. 13.3% of all households were made up of individuals, and 5.5% had someone living alone who was 65 years of age or older. The average household size was 2.94 and the average family size was 3.23.

In the city, the population was spread out, with 32.6% under the age of 18, 7.1% from 18 to 24, 33.6% from 25 to 44, 19.7% from 45 to 64, and 7.0% who were 65 years of age or older. The median age was 32 years. For every 100 females, there were 97.8 males. For every 100 females age 18 and over, there were 94.7 males.

The median income for a household in the city was $56,192, and the median income for a family was $62,118. Males had a median income of $40,959 versus $28,272 for females. The per capita income for the city was $20,290. About 2.7% of families and 5.5% of the population were below the poverty line, including 4.7% of those under age 18 and 11.2% of those age 65 or over.

See also
 U.S. Route 61 in Minnesota
 Old Minnesota State Highway 98 – also known back in the wagon days as Wyoming Trail, as it was a trail to the many stagecoach stops to the Twin Cities. In the present day, this route is now marked as Chisago County Road 22.

References

External links
 City of Wyoming, Minnesota

Cities in Chisago County, Minnesota
Cities in Minnesota